Camille Ayglon-Saurina (born 21 May 1985) is a retired French handballer who represented the French national team.

She competed in three Olympic Games (2008, 2012 & 2016).

On 1 December 2016, Ayglon-Saurina was awarded the rank of Chevalier (knight) of the French National Order of Merit.

Honours
Olympic Games:
Silver Medalist: 2016
World Championship:
Gold Medalist: 2017
Silver Medalist: 2009, 2011
European Championship:
Bronze Medalist: 2016
Romanian Championship:
Winner: 2017, 2018
Romanian Cup:
Winner: 2017, 2018
Romanian Supercup:
Winner: 2016, 2017
French Championship:
Winner: 2009
French Cup:
Winner: 2010
Finalist: 2009, 2011, 2015
French League Cup:
Winner: 2009, 2010
Finalist: 2013
EHF Champions League:
Bronze Medalist: 2017, 2018
EHF Challenge Cup:
Semifinalist: 2011

Individual awards
French Championship Best Right Back: 2010, 2011

Personal life
She is married to Guillaume Saurina.

References

External links

French female handball players
Handball players at the 2008 Summer Olympics
Olympic handball players of France
Handball players at the 2012 Summer Olympics
1985 births
Living people
Sportspeople from Avignon
Expatriate handball players
French expatriate sportspeople in Romania
Olympic silver medalists for France
Medalists at the 2016 Summer Olympics
Handball players at the 2016 Summer Olympics
Olympic medalists in handball
European champions for France
Mediterranean Games medalists in handball
Mediterranean Games gold medalists for France
Competitors at the 2009 Mediterranean Games
21st-century French women